The Crooked Road is a 1965 British film directed and co-written by Don Chaffey. It stars Stewart Granger, Robert Ryan,  and Janet Munro.  The film is based on the 1957 novel The Big Story by Morris West. An American journalist (Robert Ryan) plans to expose as a crook the dictator (Stewart Granger) of a small Balkan state, but finds himself framed for murder.

Cast
Robert Ryan as Richard Ashley
Stewart Granger as Duke of Orgagna
Nadia Gray as Cosima
Katherine Woodville as Elena
Marius Goring as Harlequin
Robert Rietty as the Chief of Police

The Big Story

The film was based on The Big Story by Morris West which was published in 1957.

A Sydney Morning Herald profile on the author said it was "his initial foray into the world of Italian politics. To this stage, there is nothing to indicate international prominence."

Production
The film was shot in Yugoslavia over two months.

Reception
The New York Times said the film "bounces along nicely".

References

External links
 
 

1965 films
Films directed by Don Chaffey
Films based on works by Morris West
British thriller films
1960s thriller films
Films set in Europe
Films about journalists
1960s English-language films
1960s British films